Elena Sánchez may refer to:
 Elena Sánchez Valenzuela (1900–1950); Mexican actress and archivist
 Elena Sánchez Caballero (born 1957), Spanish journalist
 Elena S. Sánchez (born 1979), Spanish journalist and television presenter
 Elena Sánchez (water polo player) (born 1994), Spanish water polo player